(born November 23, 1980) is a Japanese professional boxer. He is a two-time world champion, having held the WBA super-flyweight title twice between 2012 and 2016 with three successful defenses.He is Matsuzaka Generation.

Professional career

Kono vs. Niita 
Kono made his professional debut at the Korakuen Hall in November 2000, losing on points to Toshiaki Niita. 

He had little amateur experience before his professional debut. However, Kono was able to win 17 of his first 20 pro bouts, steadily climbing up the rankings.

Kono vs. Kikui 
Kono's first title fight would be for the Japanese super flyweight title against Teppei Kikui in February 2007. Kono won the fight and the national title by unanimous decision (98-93, 97-93, 97-94).

Kono vs. Sonsona 
He then won the OPBF super flyweight title against Eden Sonsona by split decision (118-110, 115-113, 113-115).

Kono vs. Nashiro 
In September 2008, Kono fought Nobuo Nashiro for the vacant WBA (Regular) super flyweight world title. Nashiro had previously held the WBA title. In a close, contested fight, he would reclaim the belt, beating Kono by split decision (115-114, 115-114, 114-115). After the fight, Kono said ""I was able to keep my own rhythm and I thought I won. I think I hit some good punches. I did my best, but I must accept the result."

Kono vs. Rojas 
Kono once again fought for a vacant world title, facing Tomás Rojas for the WBC super flyweight title. This time Kono lost a wide unanimous decision (111-116, 111-116, 109-118), despite dropping Rojas in the final round. Kono's career suffered more setbacks, dropping decisions to Yota Sato and Yohei Tobe following his loss to Rojas.

Kono vs. Kokietgym 
Kono captured the WBA super flyweight title in his third world title shot against Thailand's Tepparith Kokietgym via fourth round knockout. at the Ota-City General Gymnasium in Tokyo on December 31, 2012. Kono dropped the Thai champion three times during round 4. The result was considered an upset. Yota Sato, who held the WBC title expressed interest in rematching Kono in a unification bout.

Kono vs. Solis 
Kono would lose his title in his first defense, dropping a majority decision (113-113, 112-114, 111-115) to Liborio Solís in a fight where both fighters traded knockdowns.

Kono vs. Kaovichit 
After Solís lost his title due to being unable to make weight in his next fight, Kono faced Denkaosan Kaovichit for the vacant WBA title. Denkaosan went down in round 4, but was ahead on the scorecards before Kono knocked him out in round 8 with a cross.

Kono vs. Jimenez 
Kono's first defense saw him fight to a split draw against Norberto Jiménez.

Kono vs. Kameda 
He then fought Kōki Kameda at the UIC Pavilion in Chicago. In a scrappy brawl that saw both fighters lose points on the scorecards due to fouls, Kono retained his title, dropping Kameda in round 2 en route to winning a unanimous decision (115-109, 113-111, 116-108).

Kono vs. Concepcion 
Kono would lose his title in a unification bout against the WBA's interim champion Luis Concepción. Concepción won the fight by unanimous decision (113-115, 112-116, 112-116).

Kono vs. Inoue 
Kono challenged WBO super flyweight champion Naoya Inoue in December 2016. Inoue stopped Kono in a commanding performance. Kono was dropped once by a left hook from Inoue before being stopped in the sixth round. This was the first time Kono lost a fight due to stoppage.

Kono vs. Tso 
In October 2017, Kono faced Rex Tso. Tso had sought to fight Kono while the latter was still a world champion, but was unable to draw him into the ring. After six rounds, Tso was unable to continue due to swelling around his eye. Nevertheless, Tso remained unbeaten by winning a technical decision.

Kono vs. Moloney 
In his next bout, Kono faced Jason Moloney, ranked 4# by the WBA, #5 by the WBO, #11 by the IBF and #13 by the WBC at bantamweight. Moloney managed to win the fight via a sixth round TKO.

Professional boxing record

See also 
List of WBA world champions
List of super flyweight boxing champions
List of Japanese boxing world champions
Boxing in Japan

References

External links
 
 Kohei Kono - Profile, News Archive & Current Rankings at Box.Live

1980 births
Living people
World Boxing Association champions
World boxing champions
Sportspeople from Tokyo
Japanese male boxers
Bantamweight boxers